Events in the year 1990 in Cyprus.

Incumbents 

 President: Demetris Christofias
 President of the Parliament: Yiannakis Omirou

Events 
Ongoing – Cyprus dispute

 The first Cypriot National Badminton Championships were held.
 The Cyprus Institute of Neurology and Genetics began operating.

Deaths

References 

 
1990s in Cyprus
Years of the 21st century in Cyprus
Cyprus
Cyprus
Cyprus